Petra Jaya may refer to:
Petra Jaya
Petra Jaya (federal constituency), represented in the Dewan Rakyat